Crime Scenes is a 2000 French crime film directed by Frédéric Schoendoerffer.

Cast 
 Charles Berling - Fabian
 André Dussollier - Gomez
 Ludovic Schoendoerffer - Léon
 Pierre Mottet - François
 Éva Darlan - Inspector
 Camille Japy - Clara
 Élodie Navarre - Marie Bourgoin
 Hubert Saint-Macary - M. Bourgoin
 Blanche Ravalec - Madame Bourgoin
 Yan Epstein - Commandant Jaoui
 Frédérique Cantrel - The sonographer
 Serge Riaboukine - The priest

References

External links 

2000 crime films
French neo-noir films
2000s French-language films
Films directed by Frédéric Schoendoerffer
2000s French films